The 1995 Toyota Atlantic Championship season was the 22nd season of the Atlantic Championship. It was contested over 12 races between March 4 and September 9, 1995. The Player's Toyota Atlantic Championship Drivers' Champion was Richie Hearn driving for Della Penna Motorsports.

Races

Final driver standings (Top 20) 

Point Scoring System:
 Points are awarded based on each driver's resulting place (regardless of whether the car is running at the end of the race):

Final driver standings C2 Class (Top 3)

See also
1995 IndyCar season
1995 Indy Lights season

References

External links
ChampCarStats.com

Atlantic Championship seasons
Atlantic